Kevin Hart: Laugh at My Pain is a 2011 stand-up comedy documentary film, starring comedian Kevin Hart. It features Hart performing a stand-up special at the Nokia Theater at L.A. Live in Downtown Los Angeles, among other material. Taraji P. Henson and RuPaul appear, among others.

References

External links
 
 
 

2011 films
2011 documentary films
Stand-up comedy concert films
Comedy Central films
Films directed by Leslie Small
Films directed by Tim Story
2010s English-language films